Calli Thackery (born 9 January 1993) is an English international athlete. She has represented England at the Commonwealth Games.

Biography
Thackery was educated at the University of New Mexico and in June 2022 recorded a personal best of 15:06.26 putting her 17th on the all time UK list. She relocated to Australia at the end of 2019 to train out of Melbourne Track Club and trains out of the Hallamshire Harriers in the United Kingdom.

In 2022, she was selected for the women's 5,000 metres event at the 2022 Commonwealth Games in Birmingham.

References

1993 births
Living people
English female middle-distance runners
British female middle-distance runners
Commonwealth Games competitors for England
Athletes (track and field) at the 2022 Commonwealth Games